Nikit Dhumal (born 4 July 1991) is an Indian first-class cricketer who plays for Maharashtra. He made his Twenty20 debut for Maharashtra in the 2016–17 Inter State Twenty-20 Tournament on 4 February 2017.

References

External links
 

1991 births
Living people
Indian cricketers
Maharashtra cricketers
Cricketers from Pune